Surkovskaya is a rural locality (a village) in Beketovskoye Rural Settlement, Vozhegodsky District, Vologda Oblast, Russia. The population was 50 as of 2002.

Geography 
Surkovskaya  is located 47 km northwest of Vozhega (the district's administrative centre) by road. Baranovskaya is the nearest rural locality.

References 

Rural localities in Vozhegodsky District